Luis Alberto Urrea (born August 20, 1955 in Tijuana, Mexico) is a Mexican-American poet, novelist, and essayist.

Life
Luis Urrea is the son of Alberto Urrea Murray, of Rosario, Sinaloa, Mexico and Phyllis Dashiell, born in Staten Island, New York. He was born in Tijuana, Mexico, and listed as an American born abroad. Both his parents worked in San Diego. The family moved to Logan Heights in South San Diego, because he had tuberculosis and they felt he would recover in the US. The family moved again in 1965 to Clairemont, a newer subdivision in the city of San Diego. His mother encouraged him to write and encouraged him to attend college and to apply for grants that would help pay for his college education. He attended the University of California, San Diego, earning an undergraduate degree in writing in 1977. Urrea completed his graduate studies at the University of Colorado at Boulder. His father was murdered on a trip to his home village in 1977, seeking money there to spend on his son's college education. This motivated Urrea to write an essay that was published in 1980, as way of processing his grief.

After serving as a relief worker in Tijuana, he worked as a teachers aide in the Chicano Studies department in San Diego's Mesa College in 1978. He also worked as a film extra and columnist-editor-cartoonist for several publications. In June 1982 Urrea moved to Boston where he taught expository writing and fiction workshops at Harvard University. He has also taught at Massachusetts Bay Community College, and the University of Colorado, and he was the writer in residence at the University of Louisiana at Lafayette. Urrea married in 1987, and later divorced in 1993. In 1994, Urrea's first novel, In Search of Snow, was published. His mother died in 1990, bringing Urrea back to California to settle her affairs, and parts of Across the Wire were published in the San Diego Reader.

Urrea lives with his family in Naperville, Illinois, where he is a professor of creative writing at the University of Illinois at Chicago.

In two heavily researched historical novels, The Hummingbird's Daughter and Queen of America, Urrea tells the story of his father's aunt, Teresita Urrea, who was known as "The Saint of Cabora" and "The Mexican Joan of Arc."

Awards
Urrea's first book, Across the Wire, was named a New York Times Notable Book and won the Christopher Award in 1993.

In 1994, he won the Colorado Book Award in poetry for The Fever of Being as well as the Western States Book Award in poetry. He was also included in The 1996 Best American Poetry collection.

In 1999, Urrea won an American Book Award for his memoir, Nobody's Son: Notes from an American Life.

His book of short stories, Six Kinds of Sky, was named the 2002 small-press Book of the Year in fiction by the editors of ForeWord magazine.

In 2000, he was voted into the Latino Literature Hall of Fame following the publication of Vatos.

The Devil's Highway won the 2004 Lannan Literary Award, the Border Regional Library Association's Southwest Book Award, and was a finalist for the Pulitzer Prize and for the Pacific Rim Kiriyama Prize. It was also optioned for a film by CDI Producciones. The book was adopted as the 2010 One Book for Sac State.

His short story "Amapola", which can be found in Phoenix Noir edited by Patrick Millikin and Urrea's own The Water Museum, won the Edgar Award in 2010 for best mystery short story.

In 2019, he was presented the Founders Award at the Tucson Festival of Books. The award recognizes exceptional literary achievement.

Criticism
Mythili G. Rao of the New York Times compares both of Urrea's heavily researched novels in an article titled "The Most Dangerous Girl in Mexico goes to America"; Rao writes, "Where The Hummingbird's Daughter was driven by an otherworldly mysticism and the call of fate, its sequel is largely occupied with the ordinary troubles of mortal life". Stacey D'Erasmo, also from the New York Times has reviewed Urrea's novel "The Hummingbird's Daughter". Praising him for his literature style she writes, "The style that Urrea has adopted to tell Teresita's—and Mexico's—story [is]...simultaneously dreamy, telegraphic and quietly lyrical. Like a vast mural, the book displays a huge cast of workers, whores, cowboys, rich men, bandits and saints while simultaneously making them seem to float on the page". Joanne Omang, from the Washington Post writes, "The Hummingbird's Daughter is paced beautifully, inexorable and slow-seeming as life itself. The daily trivia of Teresita's childhood is as fascinating as the punctuations of amazements, beauties and horrors". Luis Alberto Urrea is also admired by Sandra Dijkstra of Publishers Weekly; she writes, "His brilliant prose is saturated with the cadences and insights of Latin-American magical realism and tempered by his exacting reporter's eye and extensive historical investigation".

The House of Broken Angels, his novel published in March 2018, is based in part on the death of the author's eldest brother, his half-brother raised in Mexico. Urrea said in an interview with Terry Gross that he expanded the novel with a sense of the status between Mexico and the United States since Trump became president of the US in 2017: "But then as I expanded it, ... it started taking on more of a cultural statement and turned into a novel, which seemed to want to become epic. I couldn't shake my growing sense of rage and astonishment at the tone." Michael Upchurch in the Chicago Tribune remarked the wonderful turns of phrase in the novel about a family sprawling across the US-Mexico border and the sense of place, "You couldn't ask for a more vivid sense of place either, whether you're talking physical surroundings ("The funeral home had a fake Germanic facade and stood across the street from a taco shop, a gas station and a Starbucks") or the way people think and speak. In an interview with Claire Kirch published in Publishers Weekly, Urrea said that "he has never before received so much prepub buzz as he has for The House of Broken Angels. Kirch quoted him as saying that "It seems to be striking a nerve," he says. "I wasn't really trying to be subversive, but I was trying to be subversive at the same time. I'm always trying to, using literature, subvert people's responses."

Bibliography

Poetry
 
 
 
 

Short Stories
 
 The Water Museum. Little, Brown and Company. 2015. 

Novels
 
 
 
 
 

Memoirs
 
 

Non-Fiction
 
 
 
 Tijuana Book of the Dead. Soft Skull Press. 2015. 

Interviews

References

External links

 "Four Corners: One Book author Luis Alberto Urrea", Kinsee Morlan, KSUT, 2009
 
 Daniel Olivas interviews Luis Alberto Urrea for The Elegant Variation (2005)

“Focus 580; The Hummingbirds Daughter,”  2005-08-23,  WILL Illinois Public Media, American Archive of Public Broadcasting

20th-century American novelists
21st-century American novelists
American male novelists
20th-century American poets
American memoirists
American writers of Mexican descent
Mexican emigrants to the United States
University of Louisiana at Lafayette faculty
University of Illinois Chicago faculty
University of California, San Diego alumni
University of Colorado alumni
Writers from Baja California
People from Tijuana
1955 births
Living people
Hispanic and Latino American novelists
21st-century American poets
American male poets
American male essayists
20th-century American essayists
21st-century American essayists
PEN/Faulkner Award for Fiction winners
American Book Award winners
20th-century American male writers
21st-century American male writers
Novelists from Illinois
Novelists from Louisiana